Lagenidiosis is a type of infectious disease.

The best known species of Lagenidium is Lagenidium giganteum, a parasite of mosquito larvae used in biological control of mosquitoes. The disease lagenidiosis in dogs is caused by a new species of Lagenidium that has not yet been properly named.  Lagenidiosis is found in the southeastern United States in lakes and ponds. It causes progressive skin and subcutaneous lesions in the legs, groin, trunk, and near the tail. The lesions are firm nodules or ulcerated regions with draining tracts. Regional lymph nodes are usually swollen. Spread of the disease to distant lymph nodes, large blood vessels, and the lungs may occur. An aneurysm of a great vessel can rupture and cause sudden death.

References

Dog diseases